Thomas Usk (died 4 March 1388) was appointed the under-sheriff of London by Richard II in 1387.  His service in this role was brief and he was hanged in the following year.

His life 
Born in London, Usk was a petty bureaucrat, scrivener, and author. The Westminster Chronicle records his inglorious death.

Author of The Testament of Love and Contemporary of Chaucer 
Born in London, he is the author of The Testament of Love, which was once thought to be by Geoffrey Chaucer.  Usk was a Collector of Customs from 1381 to 1384, when Geoffrey Chaucer was the Comptroller of Customs. 
If they were not familiar with each other, Usk at least was familiar with Chaucer's poetry.  In The Testament of Love, the god of Love praises "mine own true servant, the noble philosophical poet in English" who had written a poem on Troilus (i.e. Chaucer).

Informant 
Usk had been servant to John Northampton when the latter was Lord Mayor of London from 1381 to 1383.  In 1384, he was arrested and released in exchange for informing against Northampton, for he had no desire, he said, to be "a stinking martyr."  This earned him the enmity of the party led by the Duke of Gloucester.

Imprisonment, appeal and execution 
When Gloucester's party gained power through the Merciless Parliament Usk was prosecuted in 1388 and sentenced to be drawn, hanged, and beheaded, with his head put up over Newgate.  

The Testament of Love is an allegorical prose work written in prison to seek aid.  Walter Skeat found that the initial letters of the sections formed an acrostic saying, "MARGARET OF VIRTU HAVE MERCI ON TSKNVI."  Properly decoded, the last word is "THINUSK," or "thin[e] Usk."

Usk had been a Lollard, but he was brought back to the Roman Catholic Church while in prison. He was hanged at Tyburn in March 1388, and after his body was taken down it was decapitated after thirty strokes of the axe.

Works
The Testament of Love Ed. by R. Allen Shoaf. TEAMS Middle English Text Series.

Notes

References

The Westminster Chronicle

Lollards
Writers from London
1388 deaths
14th-century English writers
Executed people from London
People executed under the Plantagenets by decapitation
14th-century executions by England
Year of birth unknown